Mariusz Mucharski (born 8 September 1970 in Poland) is a Polish retired footballer.

References

Polish footballers
Wisła Kraków players
Living people
1970 births
Association football goalkeepers